The Eighth Menzies ministry (Liberal–Country Coalition) was the 38th ministry of the Government of Australia. It was led by Prime Minister Robert Menzies. The Eighth Menzies ministry succeeded the Seventh Menzies ministry, which dissolved on 10 December 1958 following the federal election that took place in late November. The ministry was replaced by the Ninth Menzies ministry on 22 December 1961 following the 1961 federal election.

John Gorton, who died in 2002, was the last surviving member of the Eighth Menzies ministry. Hugh Roberton was the last surviving Country junior minister, and Sir Garfield Barwick and Charles Davidson were the last surviving Liberal and Country Cabinet ministers respectively.

Cabinet

Outer ministry

Notes

Ministries of Elizabeth II
Menzies, 08
1958 establishments in Australia
1961 disestablishments in Australia
Robert Menzies
Cabinets established in 1958
Cabinets disestablished in 1961